This page presents the results of the Men's and Women's Volleyball Tournament during the 2010 Central American and Caribbean Games, which was held from July 18–29, 2010 at Palacio de Recreación y Deportes,  Mayagüez, Puerto Rico.

Men's tournament

Participating teams

Squads

Preliminary round

Group A

|}

|}

Group B

|}

|}

Quarterfinals

|}

Medal round

Semifinals

|}

Classification 5/6

|}

Bronze-medal match

|}

Final

|}

Final standings

Individual Awards

 Most Valuable Player:
 
 Best Spiker:
 
 Best Blocker:
 
 Best Digger:
 
 Best Libero:
 

 Best Receiver:
 
 Best Server:
 
 Best Setter:
 
 Best Scorer:

Women's tournament

Participating teams

Squads

Preliminary round

Group A

|}

|}

Group B

|}

|}

Quarterfinals

|}

5th–8th places

Classification 5/8

|}

Classification 7/8

|}

Classification 5/6

|}

Medal round

Semifinals

|}

Bronze Medal

|}

Gold Medal

|}

Final standings

Awards

 Most Valuable Player:
 
 Best Spiker:
 
 Best Blocker:
 
 Best Digger:
 
 Best Libero:
 

 Best Receiver:
 
 Best Server:
 
 Best Setter:
 
 Best Scorer:
 
 Best Scorer:

References

External links
 NORCECA Men's Results
 NORCECA Women's Results

2010
Events at the 2010 Central American and Caribbean Games
Central American and Caribbean Games
International volleyball competitions hosted by Puerto Rico